Bickelia is a genus of flies in the family Dolichopodidae. It is named after the Australian dipterologist Daniel J. Bickel.

Species
 Bickelia digrediens (Meuffels & Grootaert, 2007)
 Bickelia parallela (Macquart, 1842)

References 

 

Sciapodinae
Dolichopodidae genera
Diptera of Africa